Aleksandr Vasil'evich Pomazun (born 11 October 1971) is a Russian-Ukrainian former goalkeeper and a Russian football coach. He is the goalkeepers coach with FC Khimik-Arsenal.

Personal life
His son Ilya Pomazun is a professional goalkeeper as well.

International

He also capped for USSR U-20 team at 1991 FIFA World Youth Championship and 1990 UEFA European champion for USSR U-18. Later in 1993 he switched his allegiance to Russia and played for the Russia national under-21 football team in the 1994 UEFA European Under-21 Championship qualification.

Honours
 UEFA European Under-18 Championship champion: 1990
 Russian Premier League champion: 1993.

European club competitions
 1993–94 UEFA Champions League with FC Spartak Moscow: 6 games.
 1998 UEFA Intertoto Cup with FC Baltika Kaliningrad: 2 games.

References

External links

Profile at Saturn 
Profile at Spartak Moscow 

1971 births
Footballers from Kharkiv
Living people
Soviet footballers
Soviet Union youth international footballers
Ukrainian footballers
Ukraine international footballers
Russian footballers
Russia under-21 international footballers
Association football goalkeepers
FC Metalist Kharkiv players
FC Spartak Moscow players
FC Saturn Ramenskoye players
FC Moscow players
FC Baltika Kaliningrad players
FC Ural Yekaterinburg players
FC Sokol Saratov players
FC Volga Nizhny Novgorod players
Ukrainian Premier League players
Russian Premier League players
FC Nizhny Novgorod (2007) players
Ukrainian emigrants to Russia
FC Spartak-MZhK Ryazan players